Janice Wainwright (born 11 June 1947) is a British former squash and tennis player. She originally competed under her maiden name Janice Townsend, but changed her surname after marrying Mark Wainwright in 1971.

Wainwright, as tennis player, made the singles second round at Wimbledon once in 1968 and won the 1971 All England Plate. She was also an international representative in squash and regularly competed at the British Open.

References

External links
 
 

1947 births
Living people
British female tennis players
English female tennis players
Tennis people from Warwickshire
English female squash players